Shuko Akune is an American film, television and stage actress best known for such films and television series as E/R, Come See the Paradise, Alien Nation, Cruel Intentions 2, G.I. Joe: The Movie, Murphy Brown, and The Steve Harvey Show.

In 1988 Akune won the San Diego Critics Circle Awards for Best Supporting Actress for her performance as a Japanese war bride in Velina Hasu Houston's play Tea.

Filmography

Voice Work

References

External links

Living people
American television actresses
American film actresses
American voice actresses
American stage actresses
American actresses of Japanese descent
American film actors of Asian descent
American artists of Japanese descent
People from Wahoo, Nebraska
20th-century American actresses
21st-century American actresses
1959 births